"Feel the Heat of the Night" is a song recorded by German Eurodance group Masterboy, released in June 1994 as the second single from their third album, Different Dreams (1994). The song is also Masterboy's fifth charting single and the vocals are performed by Trixi Delgado. It achieved success in many countries, particularly in Austria, France (where it was a number two hit and stayed on the top 50 for 26 consecutive week), and in the band's home-country, Germany, where it was for four weeks in the top-ten. On the Eurochart Hot 100, "Feel the Heat of the Night" reached number 22. 

It is Masterboy's most successful single to date and is generally deemed as one of band's signature songs. It is characterized by a "rhythmic and swift music" finding its inspiration from the Eurodance-style which was popular at the time. In 2003 and 2006, the song was re-released in remix versions, but was much less successful. The artwork of the remixes used the same picture made by Günther Blum, but with different colours (orange, blue).

Critical reception
James Hamilton from British magazine Music Weeks RM Dance Update described the song as a "routine cheesy German galloper with usual ingredients".

Music video
The accompanying music video for "Feel the Heat of the Night" was directed by Kai von Kotze. It was A-listed on Germany's VIVA in August 1994 and later published by Vevo on YouTube in November 2017. It had generated more than 19 million views as of December 2022.

Track listings

 CD maxi "Feel the Heat of the Night" (radio edit) — 3:46
 "Feel the Heat of the Night" (free and independent mix) — 6:44
 "Feel the Heat of the Night" (sunshine mix) — 6:06

 12" maxi "Feel the Heat of the Night" (radio edit) — 3:46
 "Feel the Heat of the Night" (free and independent mix) — 6:44
 "Feel the Heat of the Night" (sunshine mix) — 6:06
 "Feel the Heat of the Night" (shark mix) — 5:52

 CD single "Feel the Heat of the Night" (radio edit) — 3:46
 "Feel the Heat of the Night" (free and independent mix) — 6:44

 CD remix single 
 "Feel the Heat of the Night" (unplugged) — 3:00
 "Feel the Heat of the Night" (voodoo mix) — 6:00
 "Masterboy mega mix" — 7:40

 CD maxi - 2003 remixes "Feel the Heat of the Night" (shark mix) — 5:52
 "Feel the Heat of the Night" (the second mix) — 5:52
 "Feel the Heat of the Night" (bass mix) — 5:26

 12" maxi - 2003 remixes'
 "Feel the Heat of the Night 2003" (2003 club mix)  	7:38  	
 "Feel the Heat of the Night 2003" (special D. remix) 	7:34

Credits
 Produced by "Masterboy Beat Production" at Stession Studios, Walldorf
 Mixed by Thomas Engelhard, Rico Novarini and Jeff Barnes
 Keyboards programming by Rico Novarini
 Sample programming by Jeff Barnes
 All mixes arranged by Rico Novarini and Jeff Barnes
 Music by Zabler, Schleh, Obrecht
 Words by Zabler, Schleh and Krauss
 Published by Session Musikverlag / Warner Chappell
 Photography by Günther Blum

Charts

Weekly charts

1 2003 remixes

Year-end charts

References

1994 singles
1994 songs
English-language German songs
Masterboy songs
Polydor Records singles
Songs about nights